Lex Mpati SC (born 5 September 1949) is a South African judge, Chancellor of Rhodes University, and former President of the Supreme Court of Appeal of South Africa.

Early life and education
Mpati has deep roots in Grahamstown and the province as a whole. He was born in Durban in 1949 but his schooling was in the Eastern Cape, first at St Joseph's Catholic School at Fort Beaufort and then at Mary Waters High School in Grahamstown, from where he matriculated in 1967.

Mpati enrolled at Rhodes in 1979, under a special permit (required by black students), and graduated in 1982 with a BA degree in legal theory and Xhosa. He graduated with an LL.B. degree in 1984. He was only the second black student to graduate with an LLB from Rhodes.

Career
Lex Mpati started his legal career in 1985 and was admitted as an advocate in 1989. He became a member of the Eastern Cape Bar in 1989 and was appointed as senior counsel in April 1996. He served as a Judge in the Eastern Cape Division of the High Court from 1997–2000. He was appointed as a Judge of Appeal, first in an acting capacity and in December 2000 as a full member of the Supreme Court of Appeal. He ascended to Deputy President of the Supreme Court of Appeal in 2003, and to President in August 2008. He is also a member of the Judicial Service Commission.

He is best known for his Chairing the PIC Commission, which was appointed by Cyril Ramaphosa to look into allegations of improprieties at the Public Investment Corporation.

He attended Rhodes University as a student between 1979 and 1982, and subsequently returned to his alma mater as Chancellor in February 2013.

Other interests
Mpati is known to have been a keen rugby player and was a founding member of the South Eastern Districts Rugby Union. He has also served on committees of the South African Rugby Union and on the legal committee of SANZAR.

Honours and awards
Mpati was awarded an honorary LLD from Rhodes University in 2004 and in 2011 the Nelson Mandela Metropolitan University also conferred an honorary Doctor of Laws degree on him.

References

1949 births
Living people
People from Durban
Rhodes University alumni
South African judges